Vilma Maria Helena Henkelman (born 15 October 1944 in Rotterdam) is a Dutch sculptor, ceramist, and photographer.

Live and work 
Born in Rotterdam, Henkelman took pottery lessons from Emmy van Deventer, and studied ceramic design at the Free Academy in The Hague. In 1976 she started working as assistant in the pottery factory Groeneveldt. In 1969 she started her own studio in The Hague at the Bagijnstraat. In 1975 moved to Amsterdam, where she started a studio and gallery at the Veerkade. From 1989 to 2005 she ran an own studio in Vlaardingen.

A 1985 exhibition brochure summarized, that "in her free plastic forms she wants above all to express the essence of the primordial matter. In order to show the strength and vitality of the clay, therefore, they do not use a glaze... she works with pottery clay and forms with a quick twist technique. She bakes in an electric furnace to 1020 degrees."

Her work is in the collection of the Princessehof Ceramics Museum in Leeuwaarden.

See also 
 List of Dutch ceramists
 List of Dutch sculptors

References

Further reading 
 Berkhof, José . Céramique néerlandaise contemporaine = Contemporary Dutch ceramics = Niederländische Keramik der Gegenwart. Rijksdienst Beeldende Kunst, 1988.
 Henkelman, Vilma. Vilma Henkelman. Dienst Beeldende Kunst, 1985.
 Klein, Christhilde. 5 keramisten : Simone ten Bosch, Jackie Bouw, Susanne Hahn, Vilma Henkelman, Jos Verwiel. Frans Halsmuseum, 1984.
 Kuijl, Aart van der. Ceramic circle : Vilma Henkelman ... et al. Stichting Ceramic Circle, 1996.
 Winnie Teschmacher, Vilma Henkelman. The garden of delight : beauty in ceramics. Vlaardingen : Stichting Ceramic Circle, 1999.

External links 

  Vilma Henkelman - 45 jaar draaien website
  Vilma Henkelman at capriolus.nl
 Works of Vilma Henkelman at Keramiekmuseum Princessehof.

1944 births
Living people
Dutch ceramists
Dutch women ceramists
Dutch women sculptors
Artists from Rotterdam
20th-century Dutch sculptors
21st-century Dutch sculptors
21st-century ceramists
20th-century Dutch women